Ed Struiksma is an American Republican politician from California.  He served two terms on the San Diego City Council representing District 5.  He served as acting Mayor of San Diego after the resignation of Roger Hedgecock until the special election of Maureen O'Connor.

Prior to elected office, Struiksma served in the Vietnam War as a member of the United States Marine Corps. After leaving the Marines, he worked as a police officer for the City of San Diego for nine years.

References

1946 births
Living people
San Diego City Council members
United States Marine Corps personnel of the Vietnam War
American municipal police officers
Mayors of San Diego
California Republicans
United States Marines